The Black Ernz is a river flowing through Luxembourg, joining the Sauer at Grundhof.  It flows through the towns of Junglinster and Mullerthal.

Rivers of Luxembourg